Fall is the third EP by British rock band Ride.

"Dreams Burn Down" also appeared on the original issue of Ride's debut album Nowhere, released in October 1990. Subsequently, that album was issued on CD by Sire Records with the other three tracks from the Fall EP appended.

Track listing

References

External links

Ride (band) albums
1990 EPs
Creation Records EPs